Eddie Johnson (December 12, 1927 – October 9, 1986) was an American boxer. He competed in the men's featherweight event at the 1948 Summer Olympics.

References

1927 births
1986 deaths
Featherweight boxers
American male boxers
Olympic boxers of the United States
Boxers at the 1948 Summer Olympics
People from Longview, Texas
Boxers from Texas